Got Friends is the second EP from indie rock band The Jealous Sound, digitally released on October 14, 2008. There has not yet been a physical release.

According to a blog post on The Village Voice's website, The Jealous Sound broke up in 2005, and the songs on the Got Friends EP are "the last shreds of material recorded before lead singer Blair Shehan went crazy and more or less disappeared."

Track listing
 "Got Friends" - 3:24
 "Turning Around" - 3:59
 "Broad Shoulders" - 5:01
 "Got Friends" (Figurine Remix) - 4:13
 "Got Friends" (J. McGinnis Remix) - 4:24

References

External links
Amazon.com: Got Friends

The Jealous Sound albums
2008 albums